Poori is a 2018 Sri Lankan television series, directed by Ranil Kulasinghe and produced by Janaka Sampath Telemax Productions. The character Poori is portrayed by Menaka Peiris. The teledrama was telecasted on the Independent Television Network (ITN) with 75 episodes—airing on Saturday and Sunday at 8:30 p.m.

Synopsis 

This teledrama shows the story of Poori, who lives in a slum village with her bedridden father and Araliya, who lives in a bungalow. Maata often visits Poori and treats her as his sister. Maali is a stubborn but kind-hearted girl who lives in the same village and Pubba is her boyfriend. Together, Maali and Pubba villagers when they are in trouble. Pubba works in Madawa's garage, and Maali often visits him. Anas and Kapila are the friends of Pubba who also work in the garage.

Araliya commits suicide because her sister-in-law continuously fights for a dowry. When Sapumal learns that his only sister killed herself, he becomes excited and wonders what to tell his father, finally deciding to bury her secretly. Araliya's father visits the bungalow, but is unaware of his daughter's death. The others in the bungalow pretend that Araliya is just ill. Aari is one of the only rich people in the village and marries Suddi.

Later, Pubba repeatedly comes to meet Maali with his friends. After a few days, Anas tries to get Maali's attention, but at the same time is scared to reach her. Meanwhile, Poori gets caught by the police for tapping Arrack secretly. In order to escape them, she accidentally gets into the vehicle of Sapumal and gradually falls asleep. Without knowing that Poori was in his car, Sapumal drives the vehicle to the bungalow. Punchi Nona, who always comes to get Sapumal's bag, sees Poori and screams. Poori was then taken to the bungalow and was dressed as Araliya. Poori, not knowing anything, helplessly does what they say. Everyone in the bungalow seems happy after seeing Poori and mistaking her as Araliya, but Poori still seems unhappy.

Meanwhile Madawa gets shocked by the disappearance of Poori. Madawa, along with Maali, Pubba, Anas and Kapila search for Poori in the village but fail. Many in the village assume that Poori must have eloped with a rich guy, but Madawa believes that Poori might return. He lives several days with this belief and for her return.

After a few months, Aari ends up joining politics, followed by Madawa. Meanwhile Pubba proposes to Maali, but Maali rejects him every time he proposes. Pubba gets upset and remains eager to know the reason behind her rejection. Maali, who is known to be cool and stubborn, gets emotional for the first time. It was a new expression to Pubba as he had never seen her that emotional. She then explains why she did not marry Pubba.

Cast 

Menaka Peiris - as Poori/Araliya
Damitha Abeyratne - as Punchi Nona
Niroshan Wijesinghe - as Sapumal
Jagath Manuwarna - as Madawa
Michelle Dilhara - as Maali
Sangeeth Prabhu - as Pubba
Amarasiri Kalansuriya - as Poori's father
Lucien Bulathsinhala - as Maata Siiya
Cletus Mendis - as Wije Hamu
Janaka Kumbukage - as Aari
Shalika Edirisinghe - as Kamani
Nadeesha Alahapperuma - as Suddi
Naveen Saumya - as Maata
Sithija Jayasekara - as Anas
Damith Waragoda - as Kapila

References

Sri Lankan drama television series
2000s Sri Lankan television series
2007 Sri Lankan television series debuts
2008 Sri Lankan television series endings
Independent Television Network original programming